The Belmont Bruins men's basketball team represents Belmont University in Nashville, Tennessee. Belmont completed a 10-season run in the Ohio Valley Conference in 2021–22, and joined the Missouri Valley Conference in July 2022. The Bruins play their home games at the Curb Event Center under head coach Casey Alexander. Their most recent NCAA Division I tournament appearance to date was in 2019.

Coaching staff
Casey Alexander – Head Coach
Brian Ayers – Associate Head Coach
Tyler Holloway – Assistant Coach
Sean Rutigliano – Assistant Coach
Mick Hedgepeth – Director of Basketball Operations

Rivalry

The Battle of the Boulevard, also referred to as the Belmont–Lipscomb basketball rivalry is a college basketball rivalry between the Belmont University Bruins and the Lipscomb University Bisons. Its nickname was established because of both school's close placement in Nashville, Tennessee– about three miles apart on the same road.

Awards
All-Americans
Robert Barnes – 1956*
Adam Sonn – 2003*
Alex Renfroe – 2009*
Ian Clark – 2013*
J.J. Mann – 2014*
Evan Bradds – 2016*, 2017*

(*) Denotes Honorable Mention

Academic All-Americans

 Wes Burtner – 2001***, 2002*
 Adam Mark – 2002**, 2003*, 2004*
 Justin Hare – 2007**, 2008*
 Andy Wicke – 2009***
 Scott Saunders – 2011***, 2012*
 J.J. Mann – 2014*
 Craig Bradshaw – 2015***, 2016**
 Evan Bradds – 2016***, 2017**
 Dylan Windler – 2018**, 2019**
 Luke Smith – 2021***, 2022***

(*) Denotes 1st team 
(**) Denotes 2nd team 
(***) Denotes 3rd team

Ohio Valley/ASUN Conference Player of the Year
Adam Sonn – 2003
Alex Renfroe – 2009
Ian Clark – 2013
J.J. Mann – 2014
Evan Bradds – 2016, 2017

Ohio Valley/Atlantic Sun Coach of the Year
Rick Byrd – 2008, 2011, 2013, 2014, 2017, 2019

Hugh Durham National Coach of the Year Award
Rick Byrd – 2011

NCAA Bob Frederick Sportsmanship Award
Rick Byrd – 2012

NACDA Scholar-Athlete of the Year
Adam Mark – 2004
Justin Hare – 2008
Mick Hedgepeth – 2011
Craig Bradshaw – 2015

NAIA National Coach of the Year
Rick Byrd – 1995

NAIA National Player of the Year
Joe Behling – 1989

NAIA All-Americans
Joe Behling – 1988*, 1989*, 1990*
Kerry West – 1995*
Al Allen – 1995**
DaQuinn Goff – 1996*

(*) Denotes 1st team 
(**) Denotes 2nd team

Record by year

Postseason results
They have appeared in eight NCAA Tournaments. Their combined record is 1–8. They qualified for the 2020 NCAA Tournament before it was canceled amid the COVID-19 pandemic. They have appeared in the National Invitation Tournament (NIT) four times with a combined record of 3–4. They have appeared in the CollegeInsider.com Postseason Tournament (CIT) once with a record of 1–1. Prior to joining NCAA Division I, they participated in five NAIA Division I Tournaments. Their combined record is 9–5.

NCAA Tournament Results

In the 2008 tournament, the #15 seeded Bruins, playing in the West Region, played an exciting, hard-fought first-round game with a perennial powerhouse, the #2 seeded Duke Blue Devils. The Bruins came up one point short of the upset, losing the game 70–71 after Justin Hare's desperation three point attempt barely went wide left of the net. The Bruins rallied from 9 point and 7 point deficits in the second half to take a 70–69 lead late in the game, before Duke scored what proved to be the game's final basket with under a minute left to play.

In 2011 Belmont University won the Atlantic Sun Regular Season Championship and the Atlantic Sun Conference Tournament. The Bruins finished 30–4 overall (marking their first 30 win season in the NCAA era) and 19–1 in conference play. By doing this they received their highest seed in their history, a #13. They faced the perennial powerhouse the #4 seed Wisconsin Badgers in the second round of the Southeast Region, where they lost 58–72.

NIT results

CIT Results

NAIA Division I Tournament

Bruins in professional leagues

Current

Alex Renfroe, CB Miraflores (Spain)
Ian Clark, Xinjiang Flying Tigers (China)
Kerron Johnson, BC Enisey (Russia)
J.J. Mann, Okapi Aalst (Belgium)
Amanze Egekeze, P.A.O.K. BC (Greece)
Austin Luke, Yoast United (Netherlands)
Dylan Windler, Cleveland Cavaliers
Kevin McClain, Baskets Oldenburg (Germany)

Record book

Retired numbers

Individual career records

References

External links